Emilio Chuayffet Chemor  (born 3 October 1951) is a Mexican lawyer and politician affiliated with the Institutional Revolutionary Party since 1969.

He previously held the office of Governor of the State of Mexico from 1993 to 1995 and Secretary of the Interior during the government of Ernesto Zedillo. He served as Secretary of Public Education under President Enrique Peña Nieto.

Early life
He is of Lebanese descent.

Political career
Chuayffet entered in politics in 1974 when he was appointed as delegate of Benito Juarez. In 1982 he was elected as Mayor of Toluca. In that same year he was appointed as Secretary of Education, Culture and Social Welfare of the State of Mexico, office that he hold until 1987.

In 1990 he was designated as head of the newly created Federal Electoral Institute.

In 1993 he was elected as Governor of Mexico, taking office later on September 16. Two years later, in 1995 he was appointed by Ernesto Zedillo as Secretary of the Interior, he resigned in 1998 following the Acteal massacre.

In 2003 he was elected as Deputy of the LIX Legislature of the Mexican Congress representing the State of Mexico. He was reelected in 2009 as Deputy on the LXI Legislature and from 1 September to 15 December 2011 he served as President of the Directive Board.

Since 1 December 2012 he serves as Secretary of Public Education.

On 27 August 2015, President Enrique Peña Nieto named Aurelio Nuño to replace Emilio Chuayffet as Secretary of Public Education. Ill health following a gall bladder removal was speculated as the cause, since no explanation was offered.

References

1951 births
Living people
Politicians from Mexico City
20th-century Mexican lawyers
Mexican people of Lebanese descent
National Autonomous University of Mexico alumni
Governors of the State of Mexico
Mexican Secretaries of the Interior
Mexican Secretaries of Education
Municipal presidents in the State of Mexico
Presidents of the Chamber of Deputies (Mexico)
Members of the Chamber of Deputies (Mexico) for the State of Mexico
Honorary Knights Commander of the Order of the British Empire
Institutional Revolutionary Party politicians
20th-century Mexican politicians
21st-century Mexican politicians
Deputies of the LIX Legislature of Mexico
Deputies of the LXI Legislature of Mexico